This is a list of members of the Victorian Legislative Council from the elections of 30 November 1882 to the elections of 11 September 1884.

The Legislative Council Act 1881, which took effect at the 1882 elections, created ten new provinces: Gippsland, Melbourne, Nelson, North Yarra, North-Central, North-Eastern, Northern, South Yarra, South-Eastern and Wellington, with two abolished: Central and Eastern. This resulted in a total of fourteen Provinces, each returning three members for a total of 42 members.

Note the "Term in Office" refers to that members term(s) in the Council, not necessarily for that Province.

William Mitchell was President of the Council, Caleb Jenner was Chairman of Committees.

 Anderson died 26 October 1883; replaced by Frederick Brown, sworn-in June 1884
 Sladen resigned from the Council in December 1882, replaced by Holford Wettenhall the same month.
 Sumner vacated his seat February 1883; replaced by James Beaney, sworn-in March 1883.

References

 Re-member (a database of all Victorian MPs since 1851). Parliament of Victoria.

Members of the Parliament of Victoria by term
19th-century Australian politicians